Redouble may refer to:

 Redouble, a call in contract bridge
 Redoubling, a use of the doubling cube in backgammon

See also 
 Redoublement (fencing)